Pleomorphism is a term used in histology and cytopathology to describe variability in the size, shape and staining of cells and/or their nuclei. Several key determinants of cell and nuclear size, like ploidy and the regulation of cellular metabolism, are commonly disrupted in tumors. Therefore,  cellular and nuclear pleomorphism is one of the earliest hallmarks of cancer progression and a feature characteristic of malignant neoplasms and dysplasia. Certain benign cell types may also exhibit pleomorphism, e.g. neuroendocrine cells, Arias-Stella reaction.

A rare type of rhabdomyosarcoma that is found in adults is known as pleomorphic rhabdomyosarcoma.

Despite the prevalence of pleomorphism in human pathology, its role in disease progression is unclear. In epithelial tissue, pleomorphism in cellular size can induce packing defects and disperse aberrant cells. But the consequence of atypical cell and nuclear morphology in other tissues is unknown.

See also
Anaplasia
Cell growth
Cytopathology
Giant cell carcinoma of the lung
Nuclear atypia

References

Histology
Pathology
Cell biology